I Drink for a Reason is a 2009 book by American actor and comedian David Cross. The book features memoirs, satirical fictional memoirs and material from Cross that originally appeared in other publications.

Audiobook
An audiobook of the book was read by Cross featuring guest appearances by H. Jon Benjamin and Kristen Schaal and the bands Les Savy Fav and Yo La Tengo. Cross would frequently digress from the book to comment directly to the listener, often to chide them for buying an audio book over the written version.

External links

2009 non-fiction books
Works by David Cross
American memoirs
Comedy books